Scotched in Scotland is a 1954 short subject directed by Jules White starring American slapstick comedy team The Three Stooges (Moe Howard, Larry Fine and Shemp Howard). It is the 158th entry in the series released by Columbia Pictures starring the comedians, who released 190 shorts for the studio between 1934 and 1959.

Plot
The Stooges are detective school graduates shipped off to Scotland. Dressed in kilts and talking in phony Scottish accents, the Stooges (as McMoe, McLarry, and McShemp) are given the task of guarding the prized possessions of the castle's owner (Herbert Evans). The castle staff is actually ransacking the place while the boys sleep there, though they eventually get the baddies.

Cast

Credited
 Moe Howard as Moe
 Larry Fine as Larry
 Shemp Howard as Shemp
 Christine McIntyre as Lorna Doone
 Phil Van Zandt as Dean O. U. Gonga
 Charles Knight as Angus

Uncredited
 Herbert Evans as The Earl of Glenheather (stock footage)
 Ted Lorch as McPherson (stock footage)
 George Pembroke as McPherson (new footage)
 Jules White as Skeleton

Production notes
Scotched in Scotland is a remake of 1948's The Hot Scots, using ample recycled footage from the original film. A whistling, howling wind-like sound is added to the soundtrack to give the film a more "spooky" effect; this was not done in The Hot Scots. George Pembroke doubles for the late Ted Lorch in new scenes; Lorch died in November 1947. New footage was filmed on January 19–20, 1954.

The new footage filmed for Scotched in Scotland marks the final appearance of butler-style actor Charles Knight who plays Angus.

References to a Gillette advertising slogan are also featured several times using a parrot and a skeleton. The slogan, "How are you fixed for blades?", began in 1952 using the Gillette mascot, Sharpie the Parrot.

References

External links 
 
 
Scotched in Scotland at threestooges.net

1954 films
1954 comedy films
The Three Stooges films
American black-and-white films
The Three Stooges film remakes
Films directed by Jules White
Films set in Scotland
Columbia Pictures short films
American comedy short films
1950s English-language films
1950s American films